The 1946 National Football League Draft was held on January 14, 1946, at the Commodore Hotel in New York City, New York.

The selections were initially withheld from the public out of fear that the newly formed All-America Football Conference would sign away players selected high. With the first overall pick of the draft, the Boston Yanks selected quarterback Frank Dancewicz. The most notable draft choice in this player selection meeting was made by the Washington Redskins and remains one of the biggest draft blunders of all time. They chose Cal Rossi with the 9th overall pick, but Rossi, a junior at UCLA, was not eligible to be drafted. They chose him again in the 1947 NFL draft, but he never played football professionally.

Player selections

Round one

Round two

Round three

Round four

Round five

Round six

Round seven

Round eight

Round nine

Round ten

Round eleven

Round twelve

Round thirteen

Round fourteen

Round fifteen

Round sixteen

Round seventeen

Round eighteen

Round nineteen

Round twenty

Round twenty-one

Round twenty-two

Round twenty-three

Round twenty-four

Round twenty-five

Round twenty-six

Round twenty-seven

Round twenty-eight

Round twenty-nine

Round thirty

Round thirty-one

Round thirty-two

Hall of Famers
 George Connor, tackle from Notre Dame taken 1st round 5th overall by the New York Giants.
Inducted: Professional Football Hall of Fame class of 1975.

Notable undrafted players

References

External links
 NFL.com – 1946 Draft
 databaseFootball.com – 1946 Draft
 Pro Football Hall of Fame 

National Football League Draft
Draft
NFL Draft
NFL Draft
American football in New York City
Sports in Manhattan
Sporting events in New York City
1940s in Manhattan